Daniel Monks is an Australian actor and screenwriter. He was the writer, star and a producer of Pulse which saw him nominated for the 2018 AACTA Award for Best Actor in a Leading Role. He was nominated for the 2018 Helpmann Award for Best Male Actor in a Play for the Malthouse Theatre presentation of The Real and Imagined History of the Elephant Man.

In 2020, Monk won Best Performer in a Play at The Stage Debut Awards for his performance in Teenage Dick at the Donmar Warehouse.

References

External links
 

Australian male film actors
Australian male stage actors
Australian LGBT actors
Australian LGBT screenwriters
Living people
Year of birth missing (living people)
21st-century LGBT people